Phú Thọ is a province in northern Vietnam. The province covers an area of 3534.56 square kilometres and, as of 2019, it had a population of 1,463,726.

The history of Phú Thọ is linked to the 18 dynasties of Hùng kings who were credited with building the nation of Văn Lang. Because of its strategic location, the province is known as the "West Gate of Hanoi". It is located at the confluence of two large rivers: the Red River and the Da River, and in a transitional area between the Red River Delta the country's northern mountainous provinces. Phú Thọ is one of the poorest areas of Vietnam and the poorest households earn below US$6 per person per month. Tea is important to the economy of the province. The Hung Kings temple complex, located on Nghĩa Lĩnh mountain in Việt Trì, is a complex of majestic architecture enclosing Hạ Temple (built in the 15th century), Thiện Quang pagoda, Giếng, Trung and Thuong temples, and King Hung's tomb.

History

The history of the area is traced to the early third millennium BC during the Hong Bang period. Hence, the province was part of the first Vietnamese state known as Xich Quy. The Vietnamese rulers of this period are now collectively known as the Hùng kings. Later, the capital was moved to Phong Châu, which is taken as evidence of the historicity of the province. There are many festivals in the province linked to this historical lineage. Beginning in the third century BC during the Thuc dynasty, the Hùng Temple complex, located on Nghĩa Lĩnh mountain, was laid ground to dedicate to the Hùng kings who are credited with building the nation.

In December 1999, Nguyễn Thị Thủy, the leader of an unregistered Protestant house church in the province, was sentenced to one year in prison for "interfering with an officer doing his duty", which caused some religious controversy in the province.

Geography
Located in northern Vietnam, it is situated at the head of a triangular formation of the Red River Delta in the northern mountainous region. It is delimited by the provinces of Tuyên Quang and Yên Bài in the north, Sơn La and Hòa Bình in the west, Hà Tây to the south, and Hà Giang and Vĩnh Phúc to the east. These provinces are connected to Hanoi, the capital of Vietnam. Phú Thọ province, due to its strategic location, is often called the "West Gate of Hanoi". Its location is at the confluence of two large rivers namely, the Red and Da Rivers; this province links the northern provinces of the Red River delta with the country's mountainous provinces and also the two Chinese provinces of Guangxi and Yunnan.

Climate
Phú Thọ is located in the subtropical monsoon region. Humidity is high during the monsoon season from May to October with the annual average figure of 85%; in the dry season it goes below 80%. Precipitation is in the form of rainfall, most of it falling during the monsoon period. Most of the rain usually falls between April and September.

Water resources

Three large rivers flow through the province: the Red, Lô and Da rivers, which ensure a plentiful source of water serving daily life as well as industrial purposes. The annual surface water resources in the province in its river systems has been assessed as 42,000,000,000 cubic meters.

Mineral resources
The mineral resources recorded in Phú Thọ province are kaolin, feldspar, spirit ores, stone and gravel sand for construction and mineral water.

Xuân Sơn National Park
The Xuân Sơn National Park was established in February 2002. It is located approximately 80 km from Việt Trì City. The park is biologically rich with some 465 species of upper plants and 282 species of fauna, including 23 species of amphibians, 30 species of reptiles, 168 species of birds and 61 species of mammals. Rarer species, such as Tibetan bears, white pheasants, gray gibbons, and cobras are common in the park. The highest points of the park are Mount Voi (1,387m), Mount Ten (1,244m) and Mount Cẩn (1,144m). There are extensive grottoes and caves running 7–8  km inside these mountains; they contain large populations of bats.

Administrative divisions
Phú Thọ is subdivided into 13 district-level sub-divisions:

 11 districts:

 Cẩm Khê
 Đoan Hùng
 Hạ Hòa
 Lâm Thao
 Phù Ninh
 Tam Nông
 Tân Sơn
 Thanh Ba
 Thanh Sơn
 Thanh Thủy
 Yên Lập

 1 district-level town:
 Phú Thọ
 1 provincial city:
 Việt Trì (capital)

They are further subdivided into 11 commune-level towns (or townlets), 248 communes, and 18 wards.

Table of local government divisions

Demographics

The province has one town municipality, ten rural districts, five precincts, nine district-level towns  and 181 communes.

It is one of the least populated provinces in the northern midlands and mountain areas of Vietnam. The male population at this time was 660,200 with females accounting for 704,500. The rural population was 1,146,700 against an urban population of 218,000 (about 20% of the rural population). The average population density is 3,706 per km2 except Việt Trì City, where it is 21,042 per km2.

Ethnic Vietnamese (Kinh), Mường, Dao and Sán Chay are the dominant ethnic groups which live in the province. The Dao build their houses in the traditional style, built either on stilts, level with the ground or half on stilts and the other half beaten with earth. Du village, located within the Xuân Sơn National Park, contains an overwhelming majority of this ethnic group is a tourist attraction.

Economy

Phú Thọ is one of the poorest areas of Vietnam; the poorest households earn below $6 (USD) per person per month. As of 1997, the provincial economy was roughly evenly split at 33% of the workforce working in agriculture, industry and in services respectively. In the period during 1990–1995, the annual increase rate in income 72%. The city of Việt Trì (population 181,123 (2009)) is the headquarters of many companies and groups active in the province and contains many of the industrial firms and service industries.

In agriculture, tea is important to the economy and is the main industrial crop. In the mid-19th century, the established the tea industry in Vietnam, particularly in Phú Thọ province and they had established three research stations to promote tea plantations  which were cultivated in Vietnam. Until 1945, during World War II, the tea gardens were deserted, and post-World War II development of the tea industry restarted with assistance from other tea producing countries. The Vietnamese established a Tea Development Incorporation. The province has an annual production of 31,000 tons of fresh tea (7,000 tonnes of dry tea), although between 1998 and 2001 there was an annual rise of 8% due to the increase in area and yield. As of 2002, the annual production was estimated at 100,000 tons of dry tea, tea consumption stood at 20,000 tonnes a year and 80,000 tons were exported. Over 15,000 families in the province are involved in tea production.

The French agency Agence Française de Développement (AFD) are active in the province and have financed a tea production development program for villages in eight of the province's districts and aims contribute to the economic development of rural populations and improve their living conditions. The project has also facilitated improvements in infrastructure in some 115 km of existing routes.

The Vietnamese government had a development strategy for the 2001–10, aiming to improve the output and income of the provincial economy, aiming to double its GDP, increase exports fourfold and strengthen the socialist market economy. Some of the relevant economics statistics related the agriculture and industries sectors are given below. As against the national figure of 273 Agriculture, Forestry and Fishery cooperatives there are 100 cooperatives, of which 96 are agricultural cooperatives and three are fisheries cooperatives. The number of cooperatives is 100 as against 7592 cooperatives in the country. There are only 192 farms (last reported in 2002) as against the national number of 120,699.

The output value of agriculture produce at constant 1994 prices in the province was 1686.6 billion đồngs against the national value of 156,681.9 billion dongs. The province produced 280,300 tonnes of cereals  as against the national production of 421.3 million tonnes.

The province is also known for its grapefruit, palm oil, rice and cassava; freshwater fish are caught in the Red River. In 2007, the industrial output of the province was 11705.1 billion dongs against the national output of 1.47 million billion dongs.

Culture

Đền Hùng is a national historical location where the Vietnamese give their respects to Hung kings because of their contributions to the country 4000 years ago.

Hung Kings temple complex
Hung Kings Temple, located on Nghĩa Lĩnh Mountain, 175 meters by sea level in Việt Trì city, is a complex of majestic architectures encompassing the Hạ Temple, the Thiền Quang pagoda, the Giếng, Trung and Thuong temples, and King Hung's tomb. The Hạ temple was built in the 15th century and is approached from the Dai Mon Gate. There is also a 700-year-old tree in front of this temple. The legend narrated to this temple is that Âu Cơ gave birth to 100 children. Her husband, Lạc Long Quân, led 50 of the children to the coastal region and settled them to propagate his race. Âu Cơ took 49 children up to the mountainous area. The eldest among these children became Hùng king and renamed the country Văn Lang and made Phong Châu its capital.

The Thuong Temple is approached from Trung Temple over a pathway, which has 102 brick steps. The kings worshipped the Sun God, the Earth God, the Rice God, and Saint Dong. At this temple location, the last ruler of the 18th Hung dynasty handed the reins of his kingdom to Thục Phán, who established a memorial stone pillar and took an oath that he would maintain the temple and also the inheritance of the Hung's family. King Hung's tomb is the tomb of a ruler of the 6th Hung dynasty. It is claimed the 6th dynasty Hung king, after defeating the intruders to his country, removed his dress and hung them on the branch of the kim giao tree. He soon after died right at that location. Giếng Temple is at the foot of the mountain where an 18th dynasty king's daughters, Ngọc Hoa and Tiên Dung, worshipped. They used their reflection in the water surface of the well to manicure their hair.

Festival
A festival known as the "Hung Temple Festival" is held from 8th to the 11th day of the third lunar month with the  main festival being held the 10th day in Nghĩa Lĩnh Mountain, Hy Cuong Commune, Việt Trì City and Phú Thọ Province. At this festival, 18 dynasties of Hung kings are worshipped for establishing the then Văn Lang State, predecessor to present-day Vietnam. It is celebrated with lot of pomp and show as a love and pride of their homeland and ancestral land, when all the descendants of the Hung Kings gather for the festivities in which the state officials also take part. A grand procession of 100 young men and women in their traditional costumes, symbolizing children of the "Dragon and Fairy" is held. The procession is followed by a Xoan singing performance (folk songs of Vĩnh Phúc) in the Thuong Temple; a classical opera known as ca tru is held in the Hà temple. Other festivities include bamboo swings, nem con (throwing a sacred ball through the ring), cham thau (beating bronze drums) and dam duong (pounding rice).

Education
Education and training system is well established in the province. Hung Vuong University, Continuous Education Centers of the province and at all districts, Transformatic and Language Center, and other colleges and vocational schools are the institutions which contribute richly to the educational standards of the province. They help in generating the required well-trained and skilled workers. There are 542 schools (8,779 classes) with a total of 304,326 pupils, and four high schools totalling 30,221 pupils. There are three colleges and one pre-university.

Transport and communications
The province is very well connected by roads, rail, air and water transport systems that connect with all regions in Vietnam, which has facilitated its economic growth. 
Roads

The important road system consist of the National Highway No. 2, Yunnan–Kunming express highway route that runs from China's Yunnan province through the Tuyên Quang and Phú Thọ provinces to Nội Bài International Airport; it continues as National Highway No. 5 to Haiphong and National Highway No. 18 links to the port of Cái Lân in Quảng Ninh province. National Highway 32A, which runs from Hanoi traverses through Phú Thọ and terminates in Hòa Bình. National Highway 32C, also from Hanoi, passes through Phú Thọ to Yên Bài, eventually entering Laos. The Tran-Asian road and the Hồ Chí Minh trail also pass through the province.

Railway
A Trans-Asia railway line runs from Yunnan to Hanoi and goes through Lào Cai and Phú Thọ provinces. This is connected with the Hanoi-Haiphong and Hanoi-Hồ Chí Minh City railways. The railway connects to the two industrial zones of Thủy Vân and Bạch Hạ.

Water transport
Việt Trì City is an important river port. It is at the confluence of the three major rivers that flow from China through this province in Vietnam. Việt Trì's river port is one of largest river ports in Vietnam and has an annual capacity of 1 million tonnes.

Other infrastructure facilities
The electricity system and grid lines in the province are very stable. All of the local districts are connected to the national electricity network, which covers the entire province. Việt Trì City, capital of the province and its suburbs are provided with safe drinking water from a plant, which has a capacity of 42,000 m3/day. The plant uses German technology. Postal and telecommunication utilities and services are very well established for both domestic and international communication.

References

External links

Official website of the government of Phú Thọ

 
Northeast (Vietnam)
Provinces of Vietnam